The Tigers Football Club (TFC) is a women's football club which competes at the PFF Women's League, the top flight women's football league in the Philippines. They debuted in the third season in 2019. They are usually composed of rookie football players and alumni of the University of Santo Tomas.

History
Tigers FC is among the three new clubs which made their debut in the third season of the PFF Women's League in 2019. The other two clubs are Nomads and Maroons FC. The club registered their first ever win (2-0) over fellow debutantes Nomads with a brace from Samantha Asilo.

References

Women's football clubs in the Philippines
PFF Women's League clubs
University of Santo Tomas